Konstantine is a masculine given name. Notable people with the name include:

 Konstantine Dadeshkeliani (1826–1857), Georgian prince
 Konstantine Gamsakhurdia (1893–1975), Georgian writer
 Konstantine Gamsakhurdia (politician) (born 1961), Georgian politician
 Konstantine Hovhannisyan (1911–1984), Armenian professor, architect and archaeologist
 Konstantine Kupatadze (born 1983), Georgian boxer
 Konstantine Vardzelashvili (born 1972), Georgian lawyer, judge

See also
 Konstantin
 Constantine (name)
 Konstantinos

References

Masculine given names
Georgian masculine given names